Chopping may refer to:

 Comminution, a crushing, grinding or similar size reduction of materials
 Cutting
 Chopping (sampling technique), a hip-hop sampling method.
 Virtual tuning
 Chopping (violin) rapid tapping with bow, used in jazz
 Chopping, an instrumental technique to remove the background in astronomy

See also
 Chop (disambiguation)